Psyonix LLC is an American video game developer based in San Diego. Founded in 2000 by Dave Hagewood, the company is best known for its 2015 game Rocket League. In May 2019, Psyonix was acquired by Epic Games.

History 
Psyonix was founded in 2000 by Dave Hagewood, after Hagewood had previously developed Internet and multimedia software. Its first game project was Proteus, which was canceled. In December 2009, Psyonix and its entire team moved from Raleigh, North Carolina, to new offices located close to the Gaslamp Quarter in San Diego.

The company released Supersonic Acrobatic Rocket-Powered Battle-Cars and Monster Madness: Grave Danger in 2008, and continued on other projects including contract work for several big-budget titles. The success of Rocket League caused the company to adjust its business models, whereby the company would focus on developing their own original games instead of accepting more contract work.

Psyonix announced in May 2019 that they had been acquired by Epic Games. Psyonix already had a working relationship with Epic from their work on Unreal Tournament games, and anticipated the move would help them to better support Rocket League esports competitions. As a result of the purchase Rocket League was removed from sale on its original distribution service Steam.

Games developed

Canceled 
 Proteus
 Vampire Hunter: The Dark Prophecy
 Nosgoth

References

Footnotes

Notes

External links 
 

2000 establishments in North Carolina
2019 mergers and acquisitions
Companies based in San Diego
American companies established in 2000
Video game companies established in 2000
Video game companies of the United States
Video game development companies
Epic Games